Eretmocera haemogastra is a moth of the family Scythrididae. It was described by Edward Meyrick in 1936. It is found in the Democratic Republic of the Congo (Equateur).

The wingspan is about 11 mm. The forewings are deep blue-purple and the hindwings are dark bronzy-grey, sometimes with a faint reddish tinge.

The larvae feed within the flowers of Coleus species.

References

haemogastra
Moths described in 1936